is a District in Zhangzhou in southern Fujian Province in the People's Republic of China. It is located just outside the Zhangzhou's central urban area.

Local Dialect
The one and only local dialect of Changtai District is Hokkien, which is spoken with a unique Changtai accent that falls under the Zhangzhou Hokkien accent umbrella, but bears significant differences in pronunciation of certain Chinese characters from the well-known Zhangzhou city accent.

Climate

Administrative divisions
Towns:
Wu'an, Yanxi, Chenxiang, Fangyang

The only township is Banli Township

References

County-level divisions of Fujian
Zhangzhou